Tsvetan is a masculine given name. It may refer to:

Tsvetan Atanasov (born 1948), Bulgarian football player
Tsvetan Dimitrov (born 1987), Bulgarian football player
Tsvetan Filipov (born 1988), Bulgarian football player
Tsvetan Gashevski (born 1970), Bulgarian arm wrestler
Tsvetan Genkov (born 1984), Bulgarian football player
Tsvetan Iliev (born 1990), Bulgarian football player
Tsvetan Krastev (born 1978), Bulgarian football player and referee
Tsvetan Radoslavov (1863–1931), Bulgarian teacher and author of the current national anthem of Bulgaria
Tsvetan Sokolov (born 1989), Bulgarian volleyball player
Tsvetan Todorov (born 1939), Franco-Bulgarian philosopher
Tsvetan Tsvetanov (born 1965), Bulgarian politician
Tsvetan Varsanov (born 1991), footballer
Tsvetan Vasilev (born 1959), banker
Tsvetan Veselinov (born 1947), footballer
Tsvetan Yonchev (born 1956), footballer
Tsvetan Yotov (born 1989), Bulgarian football player
Tsvetan Zarev (born 1983), Bulgarian football player

See also
Tsvetochny
Tsvety

Bulgarian masculine given names